Peter Charles,   (born 1 January 1960) is an Irish-British equestrian who competes in the sport of show jumping.

Originally a competitor for Great Britain, Charles changed nationalities to Irish in 1992. In 2007, he relinquished his status as an Irish rider and once again began representing Great Britain.  He was in the British team which won the gold medal at the 2012 Olympics.

Charles was appointed Member of the Order of the British Empire (MBE) in the 2013 New Year Honours for services to equestrianism.

Charles reportedly sold his gold medal-winning horse, Vindicat W, to rock star Bruce Springsteen for his showjumper daughter Jessica.

See also
 2012 Summer Olympics and Paralympics gold post boxes

References 

1960 births
British show jumping riders
Equestrians at the 1992 Summer Olympics
Equestrians at the 1996 Summer Olympics
Equestrians at the 2012 Summer Olympics
Irish show jumping riders
Living people
Members of the Order of the British Empire
Olympic equestrians of Ireland
Irish male equestrians
Olympic equestrians of Great Britain
British male equestrians
Sportspeople from Liverpool
Olympic gold medallists for Great Britain
Olympic medalists in equestrian
Medalists at the 2012 Summer Olympics